The Gulla river is a river in Ethiopia which rises in the Choke mountains.  It is one of the major tributaries of the Abay or Blue Nile.  The flow of Gulla river reaches its maximum volume in the rainy season (from June to September). The river joins Temcha river after it crosses the town of Dembecha.

Rivers of Ethiopia
Tributaries of the Blue Nile